La Estrella de Panamá is the oldest daily newspaper in Panamá.

The newspaper originally began in 1849 as a Spanish-language translation insert of an English daily, The Panama Star, which had been formed in 1849. It has a circulation of approximately 8,000 print copies.

See also 

List of newspapers in Panama

References

External links

 

1849 establishments in North America
19th-century establishments in Panama
Newspapers published in Panama
Publications established in 1849